Sittwe  (formerly Akyab) is the capital of Rakhine State, Myanmar (Burma). Sittwe, pronounced sait-tway in the Rakhine language, is located on an estuarial island created at the confluence of the Kaladan, Mayu, and Lay Mro rivers emptying into the Bay of Bengal. As of 2006 the city has 181,000 inhabitants. It is the administrative seat of Sittwe Township and Sittwe District.

Etymology
The name Sittwe, which literally means "the place where the war meets," is derived from the Burmese pronunciation of စစ်တွေ (pronounced Saittwe in Arakanese language). When the Burmese King Bodawpaya invaded the Mrauk U Kingdom in 1784, the Rakhine defenders encountered the Burmese force at the mouth of Kaladan river. In the ensuing battle, which was waged on both land and water, the Mrauk U forces were defeated. The place where the battle occurred came to be called  Saittwe by the Rakhine, and colloquially as Sittwe by the Burmese.

In early 1825, during the First Anglo-Burmese War, the British forces landed at Sittwe and stationed their forces by the ancient pagoda, Ahkyaib-daw, which is still standing in the city. The British adopted the name Akyab for the place.

History

Originally a small fishing village, Sittwe became an important seat of maritime commerce, especially as a port for the export of rice after the British occupation of Arakan, now known as Rakhine State, following the First Anglo-Burmese War.

Sittwe was the location of a battle during the conquest of Arakan by the Burmese king Bodawpaya. In 1784, the Burmese expeditionary force, some 30,000 strong, encountered the governor of U-rit-taung Province, Saite-ké (General) Aung and his force of 3000. Although heavily outnumbered, the Arakanese force tried to fight the Burmese forces on both land and sea, but were brutally crushed. This defeat opened the route towards the inland Arakanese capital of Mrauk-U, which was soon conquered, ending the independence of the Arakanese. According to Arakanese lore, all of the Arakanese defenders were killed.

In 1826, after the First Anglo-Burmese War, the British transferred the seat of government to Sittwe on the coast. During the first 40 years of British rule it expanded from a village to a town of 15,536 inhabitants, and by 1901 it was the third port of Burma with a population of 31,687. In the 1860s, the Consulate General of the United States (Kolkata) had a consular agency in Sittwe. During colonial times, Site-tway had a bad reputation for malaria and cholera, although historical records indicate that it was no better or worse than many other locations along the India coast. 

During World War II the island was an important site of many battles during the Burma Campaign due to its possession of both an airfield and a deepwater port.

Sittwe is the birthplace of political monks in Myanmar. It was the birthplace of U Ottama, the first monk who protested against the colonial British in Myanmar. Also, in the recent 2007 protest marches, known as the Saffron Revolution, it was the monks in Sittwe who started the protest against the military government in Myanmar. Sittwe houses the Dhanyawadi Naval Base, named after the ancient Rakhine city-state of Dhanyawadi.

Since 2012, the Myanmar government has herded tens of thousands of Rohingyas into camps in Sittwe. There are now some 140,000 Rohingyas living in poor condition huts with limited electricity and food. Rohingya refugees can not go out or move around and also not allowed to work outside of camp. The beach at Ohn Daw Gyi became the main departure point.

Climate
Sittwe's climate is classified as a tropical monsoon climate (Am), according to the Köppen climate classification system. The city experiences a dry season from December through April, and an extraordinarily rainy wet season covering the remaining seven months. Conditions are noticeably cooler and less humid in the months of December, January and February than during the remainder of the year.

Demographics
The largest ethnic group in Sittwe is the Rakhine people. Alongside, there are Rohingya Muslims and some Burmese from other parts of the country.
The vast majority practises Theravada Buddhism and Islam. The Rohingya Muslim quarter used to be called Aung Mingala, until the Muslims were driven out by mobs during the 2012 riots in October. It is difficult to document the number of Rohingya who remain in the Internally Displaced Persons camps as the so-called "illegal people" were not permitted to register for the national census and the government refuses to address this minority Rohingya ethnic group by name.

Human Rights Watch, Fortify Rights, Amnesty International and the UN Special Rapporteur have documented the spread of orchestrated anti-Muslim violence with the permission (and sometimes the direct involvement of) government and military authorities.

Economy
In February 2007, India announced a plan to develop the port under the Kaladan Multi-Modal Transit Transport Project, which would enable ocean access from Indian north-eastern states, so called "Seven sisters", like Mizoram, via the Kaladan River. Sittwe's citizenry, especially Buddhist monks, have participated in the 2007 Burmese anti-government protests

In October 2011, as part of a recent bilateral trade deal signed by Myanmar and India, the two countries pledged a US$120 million port and multimodal investment to complete the infrastructure linking Indian north-eastern provinces to Sittwe overland via India's Mizoram by 2013.

The port of Sittwe will undergo extensive dredging and the construction of new berthing terminals. Once operational it will offer direct passage to enable Burmese and Indian shippers to pick up mainline services to and from Kolkata. The two countries also pledged to double bilateral trade to US$3 billion by 2015 by reducing trade tariffs.

Attractions
Viewpoint, or more popularly known as Point is perhaps the most well-known attraction in Sittwe. It is at the end of the Strand Road and looks out into the Bay of Bengal and the mouth of the Kaladan River.
The hundred-year old Shwezedi Monastery is a famous monastery in Sittwe. It was the monastery of U Ottama, who was the first political monk in Myanmar.
Sittwe Pharagri, the focal point of Sittwe's Buddhist environment, beside Shwezedi Monastery.
Ahkyaib-daw, is one of the most sacred Buddhist pagodas, possibly originating from the 3rd century BC in the days of Emperor Asoka. The pagoda Ahkyaib-daw, meaning maxillary bone, is believed to be built on a foundation encasing a piece of Buddha’s maxillary bone hence its name.
Rakhine State Cultural Museum, which contains exhibits on Rakhine culture and history.
Lawkananda Pagoda, Sittwe, which is the largest Buddhist temples in Sittwe.

Education

Computer University, Sittwe
Technological University, Sittwe

Sport
The 7,000-seat Wai Thar Li Stadium is the home ground of Rakhine United F.C., a Myanmar National League (MNL) football club. Dhanyawaddy Stadium is the home ground of Arakan United FC of the Myanmar Amateur League.

Other
British writer Hector Hugh Munro, better known under his pen name Saki, was born in Sittwe in 1870. A road in Singapore is named after its old name, Akyab.

Image gallery

See also
Point, Sittwe
Sittwe Airport

References

External links

20° 9' 0" North, 92° 54' 0" East Satellite map at Maplandia.com
Kaladan.com - covering Kaladan project and news

 

 
Populated places in Rakhine State
Port cities and towns of the Indian Ocean
Bay of Bengal
Kaladan River
Township capitals of Myanmar